Arena Quarter (sometimes referred to as Arena Qtr) is a mixed city centre development with residential, retail and office developments in Leeds, West Yorkshire, England. It is located in Leeds city centre and the area is best known for housing Leeds Arena.

In recent years, a number of developments have been built in Arena Quarter. This includes Opal 3 and Sky Plaza, both of which are student accommodation. Yorkshire's tallest building began construction in the Quarter in October 2018.

History

The area of Leeds near Leeds Arena, was often referred to as Little London, however, that is mainly located to the north of Lovell Park. Following the construction of the city's first indoor arena, the area nearby was renamed by Leeds City Council as Arena Quarter. The rezoning of this area meant that shopping center, Merrion Centre became part of the Arena Quarter.

Its location is directly north of Merrion Street in Leeds city centre. The inner ring road borders the district on both the east and north boundary, with Woodhouse Lane acting as the district's western boundary.

Facilities
The main two facilities located in Arena Quarter are the Merrion Centre and Leeds Arena. The Yorkshire Bank HQ is also located in Arena Quarter.

Housing

The vibrant and upcoming part of Leeds has seen major developments around the Arena Quarter. Most of the development has come in the way of student housing, with many tall buildings constructed or under construction. This included two of Leeds' tallest buildings, including Sky Plaza and Opal 3.

In October 2018, plans were announced for a new skyscraper in the Arena Quarter that will become the tallest building in Yorkshire upon completion. Altus House will occupy the site of Hume House, which has been demolished as part of the development.

See also 
List of tallest buildings in Leeds
Architecture of Leeds

References

External links
 Official website

Buildings and structures in Leeds
Places in Leeds